Dry Lake is a natural lake in South Dakota, in the United States.

Dry Lake received its name due to the tendency of the lake to run dry.

See also
List of lakes in South Dakota

References

Lakes of South Dakota
Lakes of Hamlin County, South Dakota